Choi Ji-hee and Han Na-lae were the defending champions but Choi chose not to participate. Han partnered alongside Lee Ya-hsuan, but they lost in the first round to Hiromi Abe and Riko Sawayanagi.

Hsieh Yu-chieh and Jessy Rompies won the title, defeating Mai Hontama and Junri Namigata in the final, 6–4, 6–3.

Seeds

Draw

Draw

References

External Links
Main Draw

Ando Securities Open - Doubles